William A. Durant (March 18, 1866August 1, 1948) was a United States Democratic Party politician in the U.S. state of Oklahoma. He served as chief of the Choctaw Nation in Indian Territory, a member and Speaker of the Choctaw Nation and as the third Speaker of the Oklahoma House of Representatives.

Durant also served as a sergeant-at-arms at the 1906 Oklahoma constitutional convention. He was the sponsor of a bill that created Southeastern Oklahoma State University.

He was the only Speaker of the Oklahoma House of Representatives to serve simultaneously as Speaker of the Choctaw Nation.

Early life
Born in Bennington, in Indian Territory, on March 18, 1866, he was the son of Sylvester Durant, a Presbyterian minister, and Martha Robinson. He earned a master's degree in education from Arkansas College in 1886.

A lawyer, Durant was licensed to practice in the courts of the Choctaw and Chickasaw Nations and in United States federal courts. In 1890, he was elected to the legislature of the Choctaw Nation and became speaker in 1891. He married Ida May Corber on April 19, 1892.

Durant served as a sergeant-at-arms at the 1906 Oklahoma constitutional convention.

On November 16, 1907, Durant took part in the ceremony that united Oklahoma Territory and Indian Territory into the U.S. state of Oklahoma. Durant's role was to give away the bride, Miss Indian Territory, to the groom.

Oklahoma Legislature

Durant was elected to the Oklahoma Legislature in 1907, after Oklahoma became a state, and served in the 1st Oklahoma Legislature. During the regular session of the 2nd Oklahoma Legislature in 1909, he sponsored a bill that set the Southeastern Normal School, which later became Southeastern Oklahoma State University, in Durant, Oklahoma. Enacted March 6, 1909, the legislation initially created an education institution that offered four years of high school and junior college. The school opened its doors to students on June 14, 1909. Durant was also one of the authors of a bill that dealt with the location of Oklahoma's capital.

He served as the third Speaker of the Oklahoma House of Representatives during the regular session of the 3rd Oklahoma Legislature. He continued to serve in the 4th Oklahoma Legislature and served as Speaker Pro Tempore in the 5th Oklahoma Legislature, when a special session was called to address the United States Supreme Court decision on Jim Crow laws. His final term in the Oklahoma House of Representatives ended in 1917, after the regular session of the 6th Oklahoma Legislature.

Durant served as Speaker of the Choctaw Nation during his service in the state legislature. He also served as Secretary of the Oklahoma Senate and as a Chief Clerk of the Oklahoma House of Representatives.

Choctaw Nation chief
When Oklahoma became a state, United States presidents appointed the chiefs of the Choctaw Nation. Durant, who was appointed chief by President Franklin Delano Roosevelt, served as Principal Chief of the Choctaw Nation from 1937 to 1948.

Death
Durant died in Tuskahoma on August 1, 1948, and is buried in Durant, Oklahoma.

References

External links
Oklahoma Hall of Fame Biography

1866 births
1948 deaths
Choctaw Nation of Oklahoma politicians
People of Indian Territory
Members of the Society of American Indians
Speakers of the Oklahoma House of Representatives
Democratic Party members of the Oklahoma House of Representatives
20th-century American politicians